The men's 200 metres sprint event at the 1952 Olympic Games took place between July 22 and July 23. There were 71 competitors from 35 nations. The maximum number of athletes per nation had been set at 3 since the 1930 Olympic Congress. The final was won by American Andy Stanfield. Americans also took silver (Thane Baker) and bronze (Jim Gathers) as the United States swept the medals in the event for the third time (1904, 1932).

Background

This was the 11th appearance of the event, which was not held at the first Olympics in 1896 but has been on the program ever since. One of the six finalists from the 1948 Games returned: sixth-place finisher Leslie Laing of Jamaica. Andy Stanfield, the inaugural world record setter for 200 metres around a curve and winner of three AAU titles, was the favorite.

Bulgaria, Guatemala, Israel, Nigeria, South Korea, the Soviet Union, Thailand, and Venezuela each made their debut in the event. The United States made its 11th appearance, the only nation to have competed at each edition of the 200 metres to date.

Competition format

The competition used the four round format introduced in 1920: heats, quarterfinals, semifinals, and a final. There were 18 heats of between 2 and 5 runners each, with the top 2 men in each advancing to the quarterfinals. The quarterfinals consisted of 6 heats of 6 athletes each; the 2 fastest men in each heat advanced to the semifinals. There were 2 semifinals, each with 6 runners. In that round, the top 3 athletes advanced. The final had 6 runners. The races were run on a 400 metre track.

Records

Prior to the competition, the existing world (curved track) and Olympic records were as follows. The world record (straight) was 20.2 seconds.

No new world or Olympic records were set during the competition. Andy Stanfield's hand-timed final run of 20.7 seconds was equal to the Olympic record.

Schedule

All times are Eastern European Summer Time (UTC+3)

Results

Heats

The fastest two runners in each of the eighteen heats advanced to the quarterfinal round.

Heat 1

Heat 2

Heat 3

Heat 4

Heat 5

Heat 6

Heat 7

Heat 8

Heat 9

Heat 10

Heat 11

Heat 12

Heat 13

Heat 14

Heat 15

Heat 16

Heat 17

Heat 18

Quarterfinals

The fastest two runners in each of the six heats advanced to the semifinal round.

Quarterfinal 1

Quarterfinal 2

Quarterfinal 3

Quarterfinal 4

Quarterfinal 5

Quarterfinal 6

Semifinals

The fastest three runners in each of the two heats advanced to the final round.

Semifinal 1

Semifinal 2

Final

Standfield's hand-timed results of 20.7 seconds was equal to the Olympic record.

References

Athletics at the 1952 Summer Olympics
200 metres at the Olympics
Men's events at the 1952 Summer Olympics